Cornelis van Altenburg (24 July 1871 – 2 August 1953) was a Dutch sports shooter. He competed at the 1908 Summer Olympics and the 1920 Summer Olympics.

Biography
Cornelis van Altenburg was married with Anna Maria Frederica Balck (1900 Rotterdam), daughter from Johann August Balck, owner of an old Rhineship company (J.A. Balck) in Rotterdam - still working.

References

External links
 

1871 births
1953 deaths
Dutch male sport shooters
Olympic shooters of the Netherlands
Shooters at the 1908 Summer Olympics
Shooters at the 1920 Summer Olympics
Sportspeople from Dordrecht
20th-century Dutch people